A religious (using the word as a noun) is, in the terminology of many Western Christian denominations, such as the Catholic Church, Lutheran Churches, and Anglican Communion, what in common language one would call a "monk" or "nun". A religious may also be a priest if he has undergone ordination, but in general he is not.

More precisely, a religious is a member of a religious order or religious institute, someone who belongs to "a society in which members [...] pronounce public vows [...] and lead a life of brothers or sisters in common".

Some classes of religious have also been referred to, though less commonly now than in the past, as regulars, because of living in accordance with a religious rule (regula in Latin) such as the Rule of Saint Benedict.

Catholicism

Catholic canon law definition
Religious are members of religious institutes, societies in which the members take public vows and live a fraternal life in common. Thus monks such as Benedictines and Carthusians, nuns such as Carmelites and Poor Clares, and friars such as Dominicans and Franciscans are called religious.

Clerical or lay
If a religious has been ordained as a deacon, a priest or a bishop, he also belongs to the clergy and so is a member of what is called the "religious clergy" or the "regular clergy". Clergy who are not members of a religious institute are known as secular clergy. They generally serve a geographically defined diocese or a diocese-like jurisdiction such as an apostolic vicariate or personal ordinariate, and so are also referred to as diocesan clergy.

A religious who has not been ordained is a member of the laity (a lay person), not of the clergy. However, once any non-ordained religious professes vows, especially final vows, they must be formally dispensed from those vows, which is a lengthy and formal process, with set procedures, that involves their local superior, the local Bishop or other Ordinary, the head of the Order, and the Vatican's Congregation for Religious. If they are ordained, they must also be formally suspended from and then relieved of their duties, and then laicized (formally removed from the clerical state), which is a related but separate matter. Both laicization and dispensation of vows are only done for very serious reasons, except for perhaps when one seeks to get married once it is done. The process is even more complex if they are accused of a secular or ecclesiastical offense or crime (some procedures can be expedited in certain criminal cases involving sex abuse). The state of a non-ordained religious, therefore, is not precisely the same as a lay unmarried person who is not a religious.

While the state of consecrated life is neither clerical or lay, institutes themselves are classified as one or the other. A clerical institute is one that "by reason of the purpose or design intended by the founder or by virtue of legitimate tradition, is under the direction of clerics, assumes the exercise of sacred orders, and is recognized as such by the authority of the Church". In clerical institutes, such as the Dominican Order or the Jesuits, most of the members are clerics. In only a few cases do lay institutes have some clergy among their members.

Catholic canon law
The 1983 Code of Canon Law devotes to religious 103 canons arranged in eight chapters:
 Religious houses and their erection and suppression
 The governance of institutes
 The admission of candidates and the formation of members
 The obligations and rights of institutes and their members
 The apostolate of institutes
 Separation of members from the institute
 Religious raised to the episcopate
 Conferences of major superiors

Lutheranism

In the Lutheran Churches, religious are defined as those who make religious vows before their bishop to live consecrated life, especially in a religious order. An ordained priest who is not a part of a Lutheran religious order is considered 'secular', rather than 'religious'.

Anglicanism
In the Anglican Communion, the religious are those who have taken "vows of poverty, chastity, and obedience, usually in community".

See also

 Consecrated life
 Institute of consecrated life
 Religious institute
 Religious congregation
 Secular institute
 Society of apostolic life

References

Christian monasticism
Western Christianity